The following is a list of periodicals (printed magazines, journals and newspapers) aimed at the lesbian, gay, bisexual, and transgender (LGBT) demographic by country.

Australia

The most comprehensive holdings of LGBT periodicals is found at the Australian Lesbian and Gay Archives; their holdings are listed in ALGA Periodicals Collection Catalogue.

Archer

Dandy Magazine, published in Sydney

Pink Advocate.

 Fortnightly since 2000
, also , Victorian sister publication of Sydney Star Observer
Star Observer
, also

Free
 
 
 
 Monthly since 2021

Out of print

Austria
 GAY45 - European indie journal for queer freedom & creativity - in English
 
 
 , national
 
 , national
 , launch 1979

Out of print

Belgium

Brazil
A Capa
G Magazine
H Magazine
Homens
Junior
Revista Via G

Out of print
DOM - De Outro Modo
O Lampião da Esquina
Sui Generis

Canada

Probably the most comprehensive list and largest collection of Canadian and international LGBT periodicals is at the ArQuives in Toronto. See the following website:  Our Collections.

Gay Globe Magazine Launched in 1998. Montréal.
Daily Xtra
, launch 1984
, launch 2003
 The 'Out'port (St. John's: The 'Out'port Magazine)
, Ontar

, Ottawa, launch 2002
, Ontario, launch 2000
 
 Wayves (Halifax: Wayves Collective)
 theBUZZ Magazine (Greater Toronto Area)
 PinkPlayMags (Greater Toronto Area)

Out of print
, Toronto and New York
, Manitoba
 (1983–1998). There is a detailed digital (PDF) INDEX to the contents of Angles and its predecessor, VGCC News, covering the period 1980 to 1998. Index is titled Angles and VGCC News and is available through Library and Archives Canada's online catalogue, through OCLC's WorldCat, or at the Internet Archive.  (A few libraries also have print copies of the index).
 Le Berdache (Montreal) 
 The Body Politic (Toronto: Pink Triangle Press). 

, launch 2006
 The Gaezette (Atlantic Canada)
 GO Info (Ottawa: Gays of Ottawa). .
 J.D.s (Toronto)

Perceptions (Saskatoon, Saskatchewan),  1983–2013. (There is also a separately published index to this periodical, in both print and PDF, covering years 1983–2004; check index holdings by some libraries in OCLC WorldCat and note that a copy of the index is also archived at Internet Archive;  see also entry for Perceptions (magazine), elsewhere in Wikipedia).  NOTE that this periodical title is sometimes given in library catalogues or elsewhere as: Gay and Lesbian Perceptions.
 Le petit Berdache (Montreal) 
 Rites (Rites pub).   (Toronto)
 Siren (Toronto: More Sex Please! Press). .
 Urban Fitness (Vancouver) (Health & lifestyle title for North American market.)
 Xtra! (Toronto: Pink Triangle Press)
 Xtra Ottawa (Ottawa: Pink Triangle Press)
 Xtra Vancouver (Vancouver: Pink Triangle Press)

China, People's Republic of
See also separate list at: Hong Kong.

See also separate list at: Taiwan.
乐点 / 点 = Gay Spot / GS / Gayspot Magazine (Beijing, 2007– ).

One of the longest-running mainland Chinese LGBT periodicals. Note that digital (PDF) archival copies for the period 2007 to 2015 (26 issues) have been posted for preservation to the Internet Archive. And yet one additional title form, Le Dian, has also been seen (as the Hanyu pinyin transliterated title).

Femalefield = 女性天地 (1990s?).

Note one archived sample issue of Femalefield at Internet Archive.

Les+  (Beijing, 2005–2013).

Missionary (Beijing, 2018– ).

First issue of Missionary, Sept. 2018, called "Public", created by DaddyGreenBASEMENT and "showcasing a series of personal discussions about male homosexuality in public spaces" (Emma Sun posting, Jan. 16, 2019, radiichina.com).

Costa Rica
, San Jose; launch 1994

Czech Republic
 1931–1932
 1932
 1932–1934
 1938

, launch 1993

Finland
, Helsinki 2010-
, Helsinki 2006-

Out of print
, Helsinki 1995
, Helsinki 1993–1994
, Helsinki 1975–1994
, Helsinki 2008–2009
, Helsinki 1995–2007

France
Jeanne Magazine
Stonewall.fr
, 1995-
Garçon Magazine

Out of print
, 1979–1991
, free
, 2004–2011

Georgia
, bilingual (Georgian-English), launch 2006

Germany
 BLU Berlin (gay)
 BLU München (gay)
, national (gay)
 EXIT Ruhrgebiet (gay)
 GAB Frankfurt, Rhein/Main (gay)
 , Hamburg (gay)
, national (gay & lesbian)
 L-mag Jackwerth Verlag, national (lesbian)
 national (gay)
 rik Matthei Medien, Cologne (gay)
, Berlin (gay & lesbian)

Out of print
 Das 3. Geschlecht, 1930–32 (trans)
 Blätter für Menschenrecht, literary and scientific, 1923–33
 Der Eigene, art and culture, 1896–1931
 Die Freundschaft, art and culture, 1919–1933
 Die Freundin 1924–1933 (lesbian)
 Frauenliebe 1926–1930 (lesbian)
 Garçonne 1930–1932 (lesbian)
 Die BIF - Blätter Idealer Frauenfreundschaften 1926–1927 (lesbian)
 Gigi – Zeitschrift für sexuelle Emanzipation Förderverein des wissenschaftlich-humanitären komitees (whk) e.V., national (sexually emancipated)
 HAW-Info (or Homosexuelle Aktion Westberlin)
 Homosexuelle Emanzipation Verlag Emanzipation; 
 Jahrbuch für sexuelle Zwischenstufen, scientific, 1899–1923
 Magnus, Magnus Verlag, Jackerth Verlag, national

Greece 

 Antivirus Maganize (national)

Hong Kong
For a more complete list of current and discontinued Hong Kong LGBT periodicals, see the "Towards Full Citizenship" bibliography (HK LGBT Periodicals section of that list).  "Towards Full Citizenship" (4th ed., 2021) is accessible online at this link , as well as through Library and Archives Canada's catalogue and via the OCLC WorldCat.

NOTE: several Hong Kong periodicals of the 1990s have been archived to the Internet Archive site. (Click below on Contacts Magazine and on Satsanga Newsletter, which have been linked; note also that digital copies of Hong Kong Ten Percent Journal have also been archived to Internet Archive). Additionally, contents of the three titles noted in the previous sentence have been indexed in a separately published index titled: IN THEIR OWN VOICES, which is electronically available at this link , and also through Library and Archives Canada's online catalogue (Aurora).

Note also samples of other 1990s titles archived at Internet Archive (女同誌 ；同志後浪).

  
 Dimsum Magazine, Chinese and English.  Began publication ca. 2002; later in electronic format
 Hong Kong Ten Percent Journal, primarily in Chinese, published 1993–1998 (see archived digital PDF copies at Internet Archive)
 East Tide (東壽), ca. 1980
 Pink Triangle (粉紅三角), ca. 1980, continued by East Tide

Hungary
 Boxer
Humen
 Mások ("Others") (Lambda Stúdió;  – Online version
 Na végre! ("About time!") Ráday Music Pub Kft.;  – Online version

India

See also the web page at:  www.orinam.net/resources-for/lgbt/. Click on "Magazines and Journals" at this page for lengthy list of current and discontinued Indian/South Asian LGBT periodicals.

Bombay Dost, India's only registered LGBT magazine, launched 1991, global distribution twice a year
India's first LGBT Hindi webzine, launched 1 January 2014
India's largest LGBT webzine, launched 2010
launch July 2009, global quarterly distribution
 available online as a pdf and a hardcopy.
The Gays Today, TGT, is an online magazine first published in January 2023 focusing diverse issues and components of the LGBTQ+ community in India

Indonesia

The following four Indonesian titles are noted by the Australian Gay and Lesbian Archives:
 G - Gaya Hidup Ceria  1982–83
 G.A.Y.A. Nusantara, Jakarta, 1987–?
 JAKA, Yogyakarta, 1986 Dec.–Jan.
 JAKA JAKA, Yogyakarta, 1992–

Ireland
 , since 1988.
   Gay Star/update/upstart/Northern Gay were a family of publications covering a range of topics and uses.  For example, Gay Star was mainly quarterly and normally rang as an A3 fold over with 24 to 28 pages, providing in depth articles, movie/book/theatre/music reviews, even sometimes poetry.  It had some advertising of local events and venues, and also provided advice on medical issues such as AIDs and the Health Clinic location.  The other magazines were in a number of formats, A4, A3 fold over and these were often used to get news quickly out to the community and warn them of some kind of possible issue in our communitye.g. police sting operations, people being beaten up, a predator hunting gay people.  A full set of these magazines is located in the Linenhall Library, 17 Donegall Square North Belfast, BT1 5GB, and listings of LGBTQ+ material can be searched on their website https://www.linenhall.com/.  It should also be noted that these magazines started of as part of the Northern Ireland Gay Rights Association, but in later years were independent of the organisation, but still supporting the aims and objectives of NIGRA.  The two main editors over time were Sean McGouran and Terry McFarlane.  Sean is now retired and Terry runs his own website ACOMSDave as a community journalist https://acomsdave.com/

Out of print 

 free! 2002–2006

Italy
 Gayly Planet
 La Falla
 Lui Guidemagazine

Out of print
 Aut
 Babilonia
 Cassero
 Clubbing
 , 1972–1982
 Lambda
 Towanda! (lesbian magazine)

Japan
 (薔薇族), launch 1971
 Otoko-machi Map (男街マップ)

Out of print

 Samson (サムソン), 1982–2020
 BÁdi (バデイ) (Terra Publications), 1994–2019
 G-Men (ジーメン), 1995–2016
 Adon (アドン), 1974–1996
 MLMW (ムルム), 1978–1981
 Adonisv(アドニス), Yukio Mishima was concerned with foundation of a periodical, 1952–1962
 Anise (アニース)
Bara (薔薇), launch 1964
 Barakomi (バラコミ), launch 1986
 Carmilla (カーミラ)
doukou (同好), launch 1959
 Fabulous (ファビュラス), launch 1999
 The Gay (ザ ゲイ), launch 1978
, launch 1999
Niji (虹)
 P-NUTS (P-NUTS), launch 1996
 Sabu (さぶ), 1974–2002
 Super Monkey (スーパーモンキー), launch 1979
 yes (yes), launch 2006

Jordan
 My Kali magazine, launch 2007, a conceptual digital queer publication for/by Middle East, North Africa and diaspora queers.

Lebanon

Out of print
Barra

Mexico
Aguanta Magazine
Anal Magazine
Gay PV
GHOM magazine
OHM
 Ulisex!Mgzn

Out of print
+Kulino
Apolo
Boys & Toys
Del Otro Lado
Diferente
Hermes
Macho Tips
Q-eros
SerGay

Nigeria

Out of print 
 A Nasty Boy

The Netherlands

Out of print
 

 Levensrecht 1940–1946

Poland

The Philippines
 Outrage magazine 
 TEAM magazine

Serbia

Out of print
Dečko magazine

Singapore
Element Magazine

Out of print
Manazine

Slovenia

Out of print

South Korea
 Buddy magazine

Spain
 Entiendes? 1989–  
 Gay Hotsa, bilingual Basque and Spanish, OCLC 289381704
 MagLes magazine
 Shangay magazine
 Zero (out of business)

Out of print

"Dunas Mag " - Gay Magazine in Maspalomas and Gran Canaria (in english / every 3 months).

Sweden

 QX

Out of print

, launched May 2006, global quarterly distribution, ceased publication in January 2010

Switzerland

Out of print 

 Anderschume - Kontiki. (1985–1993). ISSN 0259-5419
 Der Kreis = Le Circle = The Cercle.  (1933–1967) Zurich. OCLC number 183225766

Taiwan
 Blue Man magazine
 Blue Men magazine
 G & L Passion magazine
 Good Guy magazine
 Style Men magazine
 Tung Yen Wu Chi (Eng: "Gays Speak Out")

Thailand
See the Australian National University project website for many archived Thai LGBT periodicals in electronic format.  ThaiRainbowArchive: Catalogue

Turkey
, published quarterly by the LGBT organization KAOS GL
, published monthly by KAOS GL during 2001

Uganda
Bombastic, online and print magazine.  The first six issues (2014–2020) have been archived in PDF format at the Internet Archive,  entered there under title: Bombastic Magazine [Uganda] .  See additional related information at the website: www.kuchutimes.com

United Kingdom
 
 
 
 
 
 
 
 
 We Are Family magazine. (We Are Family magazine Ltd)
 Sassify Zine. (Tales of Black Eyed Jack)

Free
 
 , free
 
 
 Free monthly LGBTQ+ lifestyle magazine for the UK's South Coast.
 Free annual listings and lifestyle magazine for LGBT History Month
 Free monthly lifestyle magazine
 
 , established 1920
 
TheGayUK. (Pineapple Rock Ltd.)
 Free online LGBT/queer magazine produced for and by Scottish Highlanders

Out of print
 
Action!  (Action Newspaper Group) "The European Gay Newspaper for Men", distributed in Britain, France, Belgium, Holland.
 , previously 

 
 
 , literary and arts journal
 , free
 
 
  closed 15 April 1983, now formally part of Gay Times
 , North West, 2000–2004
 
 
 
 
 
 , 1987–2009 (printed)
  (free regional LGBT newsletter), closed 2008
 , closed 2021
 
  closed 1995.
 , Outright newsletter 1990s
 , closed, ran 1983–1992
  (online)

United States

National news and information
  
 , covering the arts, culture and society
 , coverage of sports events and stories about athletes within the gay community
 , covering national news, entertainment and lifestyle
 
 , South Florida
 
  (Jinx Beers, founder)
 , covering LGBT activism from the intelligent view
 
 
 
 
  
 
 XY (XY Publishing)

Regional
 , launch 1986
 , Southeast
 Baltimore OUTloud
 , San Francisco
 , San Francisco, launched 1978
 , New England, launched 1983
 , Detroit, launched 1993
 Boom Magazine, Midwest, localized in St. Louis, launched 2014
 , Greater Boston and New England
 , California
 , Kansas City Metropolitan Area
 , Illinois
 , Los Angeles
cityXtra Magazine (Central and North Florida), published since 2010
 , Dallas, Texas
 , Atlanta, Georgia
 , Jacksonville, Florida 1970–1978 Fort Lauderdale, Florida 1978–1998
 , Oneonta, New York
 , Albany, New York
 , Rochester, New York
 , Erie, Pennsylvania, launch 1992
 , Oklahoma City
 , Memphis, Tennessee
 , Atlanta, Georgia
 , New Orleans, Louisiana
 , Memphis, Tennessee | launch September 2015
 , launch 1981
 , Chicago, Illinois, Launch 2013
 , New York, launch 1994 originally as 
, Baltimore, Maryland
, Ohio, launch 1985
 Las Vegas, Nevada, launched 1997, print and online magazine, digital version found at gayvegas.com
, Florida
, Minnesota
, Denver, Colorado
, California
, New York, Lesbian oriented
, Oklahoma City, Oklahoma
 , Chicago, Illinois
 launched 1985, Central and South Florida
, Texas, originally known as the Montrose Star
, Texas, revived version of Houston Voice
, Texas
 (Nashville, Tennessee)
, free, Arizona, launched originally as IONAZ in 2001
, launched 1976, Chapel Hill, North Carolina
Lavender Magazine. Minneapolis/St. Paul, Minnesota, launched in 1995, free
, launch 1994, Kansas
, free, launch 1994, Washington D.C.
, launched 1978, Sacramento, California
 Next Magazine (New York City)
 OKAY!Q Social, The only Social Media for the LGBTQ Community
  (San Francisco Bay Area/Silicon Valley)
 Options (Rhode Island and Southeastern Massachusetts)
  (Madison, Wisconsin)
 Out & About Newspaper (Nashville, Tennessee)
 Out Front Colorado (Denver)
 Out In Jersey magazine, The statewide LGBT publication in New Jersey
 Out on the Town (Florida Panhandle, Alabama, Mississippi, Arkansas, Louisiana)
OUTCOAST (Gay Florida Travel Magazine)
 Out Living Magazine (New Orleans)
 Out Living Magazine, New Orleans LGBTQ+ Lifestyle & Community Magazine, launched in 2022.
  (Phoenix, Arizona)
 Outlook Columbus (Columbus, Ohio) (Outlook Media)
 OutSmart Magazine Houston's award-winning LGBT publication, launched in 1994
 Outwrite Newsmagazine (University of California, Los Angeles)
 , oldest gay magazine in Palm Springs, California, launched 1994
  (Harrisburg, Pennsylvania)
  (Philadelphia, Pennsylvania)
  (New York City)
 PRIZM News (Ohio) [Prizm exists to connect LGBTQ+ people across Ohio to a statewide community] (Prizm News)
 Q Magazine, Key West, Florida
  Charlotte, North Carolina, North Carolina, South Carolina
The Rage Monthly, SoCal's largest and longest-serving LGBTQ magazine
 The Rainbow Times, largest LGBT newspaper in New England
 QSaltLake (Salt Lake City, Utah) (Salt Lick Publishing)
  (Milwaukee, Wisconsin)
  (Sacramento, California)
  (Minneapolis, Minnesota, Wisconsin, Iowa, Minnesota, Illinois, Michigan, North Dakota, South Dakota)
Rainbow Pages (Southwest Florida) Free, LGBTQ News, Resources, Events
 The Rainbow Times (Boston, MA) (The Rainbow Times, LLC)
  (Seattle, Washington)
 South Florida Gay News (SFGN), Fort Lauderdale, Florida (SouthFloridaGayNews.com, Inc.)
  (Naples/Fort Myers/Sarasota, Florida)
 
 therepubliq, online LGBTQ+ publication based in Austin, Texas, launched in 2009
, Ontario
, Memphis, Tennessee
 United We Stand – Kentucky's LGBTI News, Richmond, Kentucky (United We Stand Media, LLC.)
 Washington Blade (Washington, D.C.)  (Brown Naff Pitts Omnimedia, Inc)
Watermark & Watermark Online, over 20 years as central Florida's only LGBT news source (Florida) 
The Western Express (Phoenix, Arizona) (Tucson, Arizona)
What's Happening Magazine (Florida) 
 Windy City Times (Windy City Media Group)
Wire Magazine (Florida)
Wisconsin Gazette (Wisconsin)

Lifestyle
 A Bear's Life Magazine (Bear Brothers)
 
 Cakeboy Magazine
 Curve (Outspoken Enterprises)
 Echo Magazine (ACE Publishing)
 Elska (ISSN 2059-707X), a bi-monthly gay photography and culture publication, each issue dedicated to a different city, with local boys and local stories
 Envy Man (Envy Media Group)
 FTM Magazine (The Self Made Men LLC)
 Hello Mr.
 Gay Parent Magazine (Gay Parent)
 GayWebMoney Magazine
 Instinct, Instinct Publishing ceased publishing Instinct Magazine and closed their operations. Instinct was acquired by Juki Media who now offer it as an online media source.
 Lavender Magazine (Lavender Lifestyles Marketing)
 LGBT Living & Weddings Magazine
 MetroSource (Metrosource Publishing, Inc.)
 My Comrade
 Next Door Magazine 
 noiZe Magazine (The Premier Guide to Dance, Festival and Circuit Events Worldwide)
 OMG! Magazine (publisher= OMG Multimedia Companies, LLC)
 Out (LPI Media)
OUTCOAST (Travel and Event Marketing Services for Florida's Gulf Coast)
 OUT THERE (publisher= Brown Tiger)
 Pride & Equality Magazine
 Qr Magazine (Qr Media)
 Queerd
 R* (evedesasas)
 The Rainbow Times, New England's LGBT largest LGBT newspaper; available as print or online.
 RFD Magazine (RFD Press Inc.)
10 Thousand Couples, free online emagazine that publishes articles, editorials, news, and video content of particular interest to same-sex couples, unions, and domestic partners around the globe
 She Magazine (She Girls, LLC)
 
 Velvetpark (Velvetpark Magazine)
 VizionsMagazine.NET (QNA Media Group, LLC)
 Xodus USA (Xodus USA)
 Zeus (Fenocia Publishing Company, Inc)

Health
 , launched 1994

Travel
 
 
OUTCOAST (Gay Florida Travel Magazine)

Out of print
 abOUT (Toronto, Buffalo)
 After Dark
 Anything That Moves
 Bear Magazine (Brush Creek Media)
 Black Lace (BLK Publishing Co.)
 Blackfire (BLK Publishing Co.)
 BLK (Los Angeles, California) (BLK Publishing Co.)
 
 Christopher Street
 Church Street Freedom Press (Nashville, TN, published by Freedom Press Publishing)
 DRUM (Philadelphia) 1964–1967, published by the Janus Society
 Esto No Tiene Nombre, Revista de Lesbianas Latinas
 , Nashville, Tennessee,  launch June 2017
 
 Gay Community News (Boston/Cambridge, Massachusetts) (Bromfield Street Educational Foundation)
 Gaysweek (New York City) (New York Gay News, Inc.)
 Genre (Genre Publishing)
 Girlfriends (Girlfriends Magazine)
 Hero
 Homocore
 Kuumba (BLK Publishing Co.)
 The Ladder
 LivingOUT (Minneapolis/St. Paul, Minnesota) (LivingOUT Media)
 The New York Blade
 ONE magazine (Los Angeles, 1953) first gay publication in the United States.
  (Las Vegas metropolitan area, Nevada)
 , once provided as a supplement to LPI Media publications like Out Magazine and The Advocate; no longer in publication
 OutWeek
  The Phoenix (Kansas City, Missouri)
 QQ Magazine, national bimonthly lifestyle magazine, 1969 – ca. 1982, from Queen's Quarterly Pub. Co in New York City. Started as Queens Quarterly and used the motto: For gay guys who have no hangups
 Quest (Green Bay, Wisconsin) as of 2018
  (Las Vegas, Nevada) (QLV Holdings, Inc.) 
 Salt Lake Metro (Salt Lake City, Utah) (Metro Publishing)
 
 Southern Voice
 Vice Versa
 Vital Voice,  life and style magazine celebrating the St. Louis, Missouri, and Midwest LGBT community (Vital VOICE Omni Media)

Scholarly
 
 
 
 
 
 
 , online version 
 , online version 
 
 , online version 
 
 
 
 Psychology of Sexualities Review (British Psychological Society) , online version 
 , online version 
 Transgender Studies Quarterly. (Duke University Press) ISSN 2328-9252

Historical research resources
 International Directory of Gay and Lesbian Periodicals (Oryx Press, 1987), 
 Lesbian Periodicals Index (1986), 
 Lesbian Sources: A Bibliography of Periodical Articles, 1970–1990 (1993), 
 Our Own Voices: A Directory of Lesbian and Gay Periodicals, 1890–1990: Including the Complete Holdings of the Canadian Gay Archives (Canadian Gay Archives, 1991), 
 Women's and Lesbian, Gay, Bisexual, and Transgender Movements (LGBT) Periodicals Collection, 1968–2005, Rare Book, Manuscript, and Special Collections Library, Duke University

See also
Beefcake magazines
List of gay pornographic magazines
List of lesbian periodicals

References

External links

Harrington Park Press Release Updated LGBTQ Journal List
The Portal to Texas History LBGT Collection

Publications
LGBT
LGBT publications
Publications